Rooney Ranch is an historic ranch near Morrison, unincorporated Jefferson County, Colorado. It was listed on the National Register of Historic Places in 1975.

History
Alexander Rooney came west in 1859 seeking an opportunity.
He did a variety work to earn his keep from stone masonry (Central City, the Masonic Lodge), cartage of lumber and other supplies to the mining camps around Denver and South Park, to a dairy farm. He found the high altitude uncomfortable, so he sought out winter pasture at lower elevations for his cattle. In the fall of 1861 he found what he was looking for along the eastern edge of the hogback, between the mountains and the plains. He brought his wife, Emeline, and his family west from Anamosa, Iowa.

Over the years, he acquired  of land. The ranch ran from the hogback on the west to the South Platte River on the east, from Bear Creek on the south to Table Mountain near Golden on the north.

His main earnings were from the cattle and horses he raised. He introduced Galloway cattle from Scotland. Shipped from Scotland to Missouri, he drove them overland to his ranch. The Galloway cattle provided both meat and heavy coats from their hides. He also bred Morgan horses which were sold to the United States Cavalry and the British Army. The family discontinued the cattle ranching in 1971.

Description
The Ranch buildings appear, externally much as they did in 1865 when they were built.  Internally, the buildings have been updated with plumbing and electricity. The buildings are in the valley between a hogback range on the west and Green Mountain on the east. A creek runs the length of Rooney Gulch, and there are a mineral spring, clay pits, lime deposits, and coal deposits nearby.  The original buildings were constructed by Alexander. Over the years, additional buildings were added by other family members, who have maintained the masonry skills.

Main ranch house - This two-story house with a gable roof was built in 1865. It is built of native sandstone and limestone. The mortar used to bind the stones was mined on the ranch, burned in the ranch kilns and mixed with sand from the creek. 
 Spring house - , has the same appearance as the house and was constructed at the same time. It houses a spring which kept dairy products at 51°.
Rock Ranch House
Stone house
Barn and Tack house
Original barn and stable yard - 1865

See also
Dinosaur Ridge

References

Colorado State Register of Historic Properties

External links
Official site

Buildings and structures in Jefferson County, Colorado
Ranches on the National Register of Historic Places in Colorado
National Register of Historic Places in Jefferson County, Colorado
Lime kilns in the United States